Lubieniec may refer to the following places in Poland:
Lubieniec, Kuyavian-Pomeranian Voivodeship (north-central Poland)
Lubieniec, Lublin Voivodeship (east Poland)
Łubieniec, Pomeranian Voivodeship (north Poland)